Rachel Florence Appoh (born 6 October 1980) is a Ghanaian politician and former National Democratic Congress (NDC) member of Parliament for Gomoa Central Constituency, Central Region of Ghana. She was also formerly the Deputy Minister of Gender, Children and Social Protection. Rachel was succeeded by Naana Ayiah Quansah during the 2016 parliamentary elections

Early life and education 
Rachel Florence Appoh (born 6 October 1980) Member of Parliament for Gomoa Central Region of [Ghana].She has two master's degrees currently. MSC International Finance and Accounting at University of Buckinghamshire (UK) 2015 and Masters in Governance and Leadership (MGL) at Gimpa Accra 2019. She had her tertiary education at Pentecost university, Accra where she acquired Bsc Accounting in 2008. She belongs to the National Democratic Congress party and represents the majority in parliament.

Employment 
She worked as an Auditor at KAMA Health Service, Labone in Accra.She also worked as a Cost controller/ Ac countant at Anglo Gold Ashanti Ltd and PeaceFm respectively. She represented Gomoa Central Constituency as Member of Parliament between 2013 and 2016. She became Deputy Minister of Gender, Children and Social Protection afterwards

Politics 
She was also formerly the Deputy Minister of Gender, Children and Social Protection. Rachel was succeeded by Naana Ayiah Quansah during the 2016 parliamentary elections.

Christianity (Church of Pentecost) Rachel Florence Appoh, former Deputy Minister for Gender, Children and Social Protection under the erstwhile Mahama government,  has disclosed the struggles politicians go through during elections. According to her, the Ghanaian political system has been monetized to the extent that without money one cannot win any election. In an interview monitored by The Ghana Report, Ms. Appoh said, she took a loan of GHC700,000 to finance her 2016 parliamentary bid in Gomoa Central Constituency in the Central Region, which she lost.

Personal life  
Appoh is married to Samuel Nana Opoku, and has one child.

References

1980 births
Living people
National Democratic Congress (Ghana) politicians